Hinsdale is a town in Cattaraugus County, New York, United States. The population was 2,119 at the 2020 census. The town was named after Hinsdale in New Hampshire.

Hinsdale is at the eastern border of Cattaraugus County, north-northeast of Olean.

History 
Hinsdale was formed in 1820 from the town of Olean. It was named for Hinsdale, New Hampshire. The town of Ischua was created in 1846, from part of Hinsdale.

Geography

The Southern Tier Expressway (Interstate 86 and New York State Route 17) passes across the town. New York State Route 16 is a major trunk road in the town and partially follows the same path as the Expressway. New York State Route 446 crosses the northeast part of the town and has its western terminus in the community of Maplehurst.

The eastern town line is the border of Allegany County.

Adjacent towns and areas 
Hinsdale is south of the town of Ischua and north of the towns of Olean and Portville. The west border is formed by the towns of Humphrey and Allegany. The east border is formed by the towns of Cuba and Clarksville in Allegany County.

Demographics

As of the census of 2000, there were 2,270 people, 861 households, and 625 families residing in the town.  The population density was 58.6 people per square mile (22.6/km2).  There were 1,134 housing units at an average density of 29.3 per square mile (11.3/km2).  The racial makeup of the town was 97.05% White, 0.57% African American, 0.44% Native American, 0.22% Asian, 0.18% from other races, and 1.54% from two or more races. Hispanic or Latino of any race were 0.79% of the population.

There were 861 households, out of which 34.0% had children under the age of 18 living with them, 58.3% were married couples living together, 9.4% had a female householder with no husband present, and 27.3% were non-families. 20.6% of all households were made up of individuals, and 8.2% had someone living alone who was 65 years of age or older.  The average household size was 2.59 and the average family size was 3.00.

In the town, the population was spread out, with 26.7% under the age of 18, 6.9% from 18 to 24, 27.5% from 25 to 44, 25.9% from 45 to 64, and 13.1% who were 65 years of age or older.  The median age was 39 years. For every 100 females, there were 96.5 males.  For every 100 females age 18 and over, there were 96.6 males.

The median income for a household in the town was $33,110, and the median income for a family was $36,949. Males had a median income of $27,008 versus $20,645 for females. The per capita income for the town was $14,985.  About 9.6% of families and 14.9% of the population were below the poverty line, including 18.7% of those under age 18 and 10.8% of those age 65 or over.

Communities and locations in Hinsdale 
Haskell Flats – A hamlet in the southeast corner of the town.
Hinsdale – The hamlet of Hinsdale, where Ischua Creek and Oil Creek join to become Olean Creek. The community is located on NY Route 16, east of the Southern Tier Expressway. The first house was built in 1821.
Maplehurst  – A hamlet in the northern part of the town on NY 16 and north of the Southern Tier Expressway.
Scotts Corner – A former community north of Hinsdale village.
Jollytown – A former farming community in the eastern part of the town.

References

External links
 Town of Hinsdale official website
  Early history of Hinsdale
 Hinsdale Central School

Towns in Cattaraugus County, New York